Jamie Gray Hyder (born April 27, 1985) is an American actress and model. She performed voice and motion capture work for the role of Lieutenant Nora Salter in Call of Duty: Infinite Warfare and voice acted for the operator Roze in Call of Duty: Modern Warfare. She also played Lucia Solano in season 2 of Graceland, and the werewolf Danielle in Seasons 5 and 6 of True Blood. Hyder starred as Detective Katriona "Kat" Tamin on Law & Order: Special Victims Unit from 2019 to 2021.

Early life and education
Hyder is of Lebanese descent on her father's side and attended J. E. B. Stuart High School in Falls Church, Virginia and the University of Georgia.

Career
Hyder portrayed Echo in the 2013 first-person shooter video game Killzone: Shadow Fall, the first such game produced by Guerrilla Games in the Killzone series made for Sony's PlayStation 4 console.

In 2014, she starred opposite Andrew Keegan and Ray Liotta in the music video for "Lovers on the Sun", the lead single from David Guetta's sixth studio album Listen.  The Wild West-themed music video was directed by Marc Klasfeld.

In 2016, she played Lt. Nora Salter in Call of Duty: Infinite Warfare, which debuted November 4.

In 2019, she joined the cast of Law & Order: Special Victims Unit in its 21st season as Officer Katriona "Kat" Tamin, initially recurring before being promoted to series regular beginning with the season’s eighth episode. She departed the series shortly into its 23rd season.

Personal life
Hyder married actor Michael Trotter in June 2021.

Filmography

References

External links
 

1985 births
21st-century American actresses
Actors from Fairfax, Virginia
Actresses from Virginia
American people of Lebanese descent
American television actresses
American video game actresses
LGBT actresses
American LGBT actors
Living people
Place of birth missing (living people)
University of Georgia alumni